Doris wellingtonensis is a species of sea slug, a dorid nudibranch, a marine gastropod mollusk in the family Dorididae.

Distribution
This species was described from Wellington, New Zealand. It has been reported from Tasmania and Victoria, Australia.

References

Dorididae
Gastropods described in 1877
Taxa named by Phineas S. Abraham